The Basilica of Our Lady of the Rosary and St. Benedict of Palermo is a Roman Catholic parish church in Paysandú, Uruguay.

History
The parish was established in 1805.

The current temple was built in 1860, severely damaged during the siege of Paysandú (1864-1865) and rebuilt afterwards. It is dedicated to saint Benedict the Moor and the Virgin of the Rosary.

In 1906 a Walcker organ was inaugurated.

In 1949, Pope Pius XII proclaimed it basilica minor.

Currently, a fundraising committee is advocating its refurbishment, understanding that, apart from its great religious and historic significance, this temple is also the venue of important cultural events.

References

External links

 Blog

Roman Catholic church buildings in Paysandú Department

Roman Catholic churches completed in 1860
19th-century Roman Catholic church buildings in Uruguay